The Seventh Sword (also known as Seven Swords for the King) is a 1962 Italian-French adventure film directed by Riccardo Freda. It is a remake of Freda's debut film Don Cesare di Bazan.

Cast 
Brett Halsey as  Don Carlos di Bazan
Béatrice Altariba as  Isabella
Giulio Bosetti as Duke of Saavedra 
Gabriele Antonini as  Filippo III
Mario Scaccia as Cardinal Inquisitor
Gabriele Tinti as  Corvo 
Alberto Sorrentino  as Sancho 
Jacques Stany as The seargeant

Release
The Seventh Swords was released in Italy on October 30, 1962, where it was distributed by Cino Del Duca. The film had a domestic gross of 140 million Italian lira in Italy.

Reception
In a contemporary review, the Monthly Film Bulletin stated that the Director "is here at his best" and that The Seventh Sword is "a film which is in its way delightful, with much to charm the eye and tickle the senses" The review noted specific scenes a tongue-in-cheek fight scene that plays in and out of a bedroom and "the final duel staged in a torture chamber of almost surrealist design and lurid colours"

References

Footnotes

Sources

External links

1962 films
French adventure films
Italian adventure films
Films directed by Riccardo Freda
1962 adventure films
Films set in the 17th century
Films set in Spain
Films based on works by Victor Hugo
1960s French films
1960s Italian films